Aetholaelaps is a genus of mites in the family Laelapidae.

Species
 Aetholaelaps sylstrai Strandtmann & Camin, 1956
 Aetholaelaps trilyssa Domrow & Taufflieb, 1963

References

Laelapidae